Chittorgarh   (also Chittor or Chittaurgarh) is a major city in Rajasthan state of western India. It lies on the Berach River, a tributary of the Banas, and is the administrative headquarters of Chittorgarh District. It was a major stronghold of the Rajput State of Medapata. (modern Mewar) The city of Chittorgarh is located on the banks of river Gambhiri and Berach.

Chittorgarh is home to the Chittor Fort, the largest fort in India and Asia. It was sacked thrice; first in 1303 by Alauddin Khalji, again in 1535 by Bahadur Shah of Gujarat, and lastly by the Mughal Emperor Akbar in 1568. Its Hindu Rajput rulers fought fiercely to maintain their independence. On all three occasions when faced with a certain defeat, the men fought to death, while the women committed suicide by jauhar (mass self-immolation). Chittor also has been a land of worship for Meera. It is also known for Panna Dai and Rani Padmini.

History 

Originally called Chitrakuta, the Chittor Fort is said to have been built by Chitranga, a mori king.

The Guhila (Gahlot) ruler Bappa Rawal is said to have captured the fort in either 728 CE or 734 CE. However, some historians doubt the historicity of this legend, arguing that the Guhilas did not control Chittor before the reign of the later ruler Allata.

In 1303, the Delhi Sultanate ruler Alauddin Khilji defeated the Guhila king Ratnasimha, and captured the fort. The fort was later captured by Hammir Singh, a king of the Sisodia branch of the Guhilas. Chittor gained prominence during the period of his successors, which included Rana Kumbha and Rana Sanga. In 1535, Bahadur Shah of Gujarat besieged and conquered the fort. After he was driven away by the Mughal emperor Humayun, the fort was given back to Sisodias by him.

In 1567–68, the Mughal emperor Akbar besieged and captured the fort. In 1615, as part of a peace treaty between Akbar's successor Jahangir and the Maharana of Mewar, Amar Singh I, Mewar accepted Mughal suzerainty and the fort as well as the areas surrounding Chittorgarh were given to Mewar. However, due to the military danger presented by the fort, it was never to be fortified or even repaired. Later, it was occupied by the British Indian Empire. The fort was refurbished in 1905 during British Raj.

Geography
It has an average elevation of 394 metres (1292 ft).Chittorgarh is located in the southern part of the state of Rajasthan, in the northwestern part of India. It is located beside a high hill near the Gambhiri River. Chittorgarh is located between 23° 32' and 25° 13' north latitudes and between 74° 12' and 75° 49' east longitudes in the southeastern part of Rajasthan state. The district encompasses 350.8 square km (3.17 per cent of the Rajasthan State) area of land.

Climate

Transport 

The completed Golden Quadrilateral highway system passes through Chittorgarh, connecting it to most of India. The East-West Corridor (Express Highway) also crosses it. Chittorgarh is situated on National Highway No. 76 & 79. National Highway 76 connects to Kota with a 2 hour drive.

Chittaurgarh Junction is a busy junction of Western Railway of Indian Railways, Ratlam Division. It has direct rail links with all major Indian cities including Ajmer, Udaipur, Jaipur, Jodhpur, Agra, Delhi, Haridwar, Mumbai, Hyderabad, Kolkata, Pune, Chennai, Rameswaram, Yeshwantpur, Ahmedabad, Surat, Vadodara, Indore, Ratlam, Gwalior, Bhopal, Mandsaur, Jhansi, Khajuraho, Rewa, Nagpur, Bilaspur, Kota, and Mysore.

Chittorgarh is well connected to all parts of India by roads. The Golden Quadrilateral Road Project and North-South-East-West corridor expressways pass through Chittorgarh City. The bus stand (bus depot) of Chittorgarh is located between the old and new cities. There are good bus services (private as well as state-owned) available for Delhi, Mumbai, Ahmedabad, Ajmer, Bundi, Kota, Udaipur, and other major cities.

Rajasthan Roadways (RSRTC) provides a service for visiting areas around Chittorgarh. Rajasthan Roadways also has premier services called Pink Line, Silver line and Sleeper Coaches (Grey Line).

The nearest airport is Udaipur (Dabok Airport). The airport is located 70 kilometres from Chittorgarh and linked by daily air service from New Delhi, Jaipur, Jodhpur, Ahmedabad, Chennai, and Mumbai.

Places of interest

Chittorgarh Fort
It was constructed by the Mauryans in the 7th century CE. There is also a belief that it was constructed by Bhima of the Pancha Pandavas. This fort was the citadel of many great rajput warriors such as Gora, Badal, Rana Kumbha, Maharana Pratap, Jaimal, Patta, etc.

Kalika Mata Temple
Kalika Mata Temple was originally built in the 8th century for Sun God and was later converted to a temple for mother Goddess, Kali in the 14th century. During the festival days of Navaratri, fairs are organised and pilgrims from different places come here to pay obeisance at the temple.

Vijay Stambha
Vijay Stambha, is a huge nine storey tower which was built by Maharana Kumbha to commemorate his victory over the rulers of Malwa and Gujarat in 1440. There are sculptures and carvings on the exterior walls of the tower. The tower is visible from any section of the town below. To reach the top of the tower top one has to climb 157 steps, it offers great view of the surroundings from the top. The inside walls of the tower are carved with images of Gods, weapons, etc.

Kirti Stambh

Kirti Stambh (Tower of Fame) is a 22-metre-high (72 ft) tower built in the 12th century CE. Kirti Stambh is built inside Chittorgarh fort. It is dedicated to Rishabha, the first Tirthankara of Jainism. It was built by a merchant and is decorated with figures from the Jain pantheon. It is a seven storied pillar which was built by Biherwal Mahajan Sanaya of Digambar Jain sect. On its four corners are engraved idols of Shri Adinathji in Digambar style which each are five feet (about 1.5 meters) high and elsewhere are engraved several small idols consecrated to Jain lineage of deities.

Rana Kumbha's Palace
Rana Kumbha's Palace is near the Vijay Stambh. This is the birthplace of Maharana Udai Singh, the founder of Udaipur. His life was saved by the heroic act of the maid Panna Dhay, who replaced her son in place of the prince, with the result that her son was killed by Banbir. She carried the prince away to safety in a fruit basket. Rani Meera Bai also lived in this palace.  This is the place where Rani Padmini committed  with the other ladies in one of the underground cellars.

Rani Padmini's Palace

According to legend, Rani Padmini's Palace is from which the Delhi Sultanate ruler Alauddin Khalji was allowed to watch a reflection of the Rani by replacing the mirror at such an angle that even if he turned back he could not see the room. Khalji had been warned by the Rani's husband Rawal Ratan Singh that if he turned back they would cut his neck.

Festivals

Maharana Pratap Jayanti
The legendary Maharana Pratap was a true patriot who initiated the first war of independence. Maharana was born on May 9, 1540, in Kumbhalgarh in Rajsamand district of Rajasthan to Maharana Udai Singh II and Maharani Jaivanta Bai Songara. Maharana Pratap has gained amazing respect and honor as he is seen as an epitome of valor, heroism, pride, patriotism and the spirit of independence. His birth anniversary (Maharana Pratap Jayanti) is celebrated as full-fledged festival every year on the 3rd day of Jyestha Shukla phase.

Special puja and processions are held in his remembrance on Maharana Pratap Jayanti day everywhere. Several cultural programs such as debate are also organized.

Meera Mahotsav
Meera Bai (1498–1547) was a devout follower of Lord Krishna. Meera Bai was one of the foremost exponents of the Prema Bhakti (Divine Love) and an inspired poet. Mira Bai was a Rajput princess who lived in the north Indian state of Rajasthan. Meera was Rajput princess born in about 1498 in Medta, Rajasthan. Her father, Ratan Singh, was the youngest son of Rao Duda, ruler of Medta, and son of Rao Duda ruler and founder of Jodhpur. Ratan Singh belonged to the Rathore clan. She was married to Bhoj Raj, ruler of Chittor.

Meera Smrithi Sansathan (Meera Memorial Trust) along with the Chittorgarh district officials organise Meera Mahotsav every year on Sharad Purnima day (On Mirabai's birth anniversary) for 3 days. Many famous musicians and singers get together for singing bhajans in this celebration. The 3 days celebration also features puja's, discussions, dances, fireworks.

Teej
Teej is one of the major festivals in Chittorgarh which is celebrated with great enthusiasm. Teej is the festival of swings. It marks the advent of the monsoon month of Shravan (August). The monsoon rains fall on the parched land and the pleasing scent of the wet soil rises into the air. Swings are hung from trees and decorated with flowers. Young girls and women dressed in green clothes sing songs in celebration of the advent of the monsoon. This festival is dedicated to the Goddess Parvati, commemorating her union with Lord Shiva. Goddess Parvati is worshipped by seekers of conjugal bliss and happiness.

Gangaur
The Gangaur Festival is the colourful and most important local festival of Rajasthan and is observed throughout the State with great fervour and devotion by womenfolk who worship Gauri, the consort of Lord Shiva during July–August. Gan is a synonym for Shiva and Gaur which stands for Gauri or Parvati who symbolises saubhagya (marital bliss). Gauri is the embodiment of perfection and conjugal love which is why the unmarried women worship her for being blessed with good husbands, while married women do so for the welfare, health and long life of their spouses and happy married life.

Jauhar Mela
The fort and the city of Chittorgarh host the biggest Rajput festival called the "Jauhar Mela". It is generally believed that it commemorates Padmini's , which is most famous. This festival is held primarily to commemorate the bravery of Rajput ancestors and all three  which happened at Chittorgarh Fort. It has also become a forum to air one's views on the current political situation in the country.

Rang Teras – The Tribal Fair
Rang Teras is a popular tribal fest of Mewar celebrated on the 13th moon night of the month of Chaitra. A big colorful fair and huge gathering of tribal to rejoice the harvest of wheat has been celebrating Rang Teras is customary since 15th century. It is a thanksgiving festival of farmers. Farmers pay their honor to Mother Earth for providing them food for next year.

Industries
Chanderiya Lead-Zinc Smelter is one of the largest zinc-lead smelting complexes in the world. Its current metal production capacity is 610,000 tonnes per annum (525,000 tonnes per annum of zinc and 85,000 tonnes per annum of lead). In the year ended March 2013, Chanderiya produced 443,000 MT of zinc and 60,000 MT of lead. The main products are special high grade (SHG) zinc, continuous galvanising grade (CGG) zinc, prime western (PW) zinc and pure lead. It also produces a number of valuable by-products including silver and cadmium.

See also
Nagari, Rajasthan
Bassi dam

References

Bibliography

External links

Cities and towns in Chittorgarh district
Cities in Malwa
Mewar
Former capital cities in India
Former capitals of Mewar